Nightmare is a 1932 thriller novel by the Irish-born writer Lynn Brock. It is an inverted detective story, and a stand alone work for an author best known for his series featuring the Golden Age detective Colonel Gore.

Synopsis
Following a nervous breakdown, a struggling young novelist reaches the end of his tether. He sets out to murder those tormenting him.

References

Bibliography
 Hubin, Allen J. Crime Fiction, 1749-1980: A Comprehensive Bibliography. Garland Publishing, 1984.
 Reilly, John M. Twentieth Century Crime & Mystery Writers. Springer, 2015.

1932 British novels
British mystery novels
British thriller novels
Novels by Lynn Brock
British detective novels
Collins Crime Club books